The DRG H 02 1001 was a remarkable high-pressure steam locomotive, built by the engineering firm of Schwarzkopff to the design of Dr L. Löffler. The aim was not only to improve fuel economy—the usual reason for adopting high steam pressures—but also to increase the amount of power that could be produced within the German loading gauge.

The H02 1001 locomotive was the only example of the Schwarzkopff-Löffler high-pressure boiler system, a complex technology in which heat was extracted from the firebox by tubes filled with steam rather than boiling water. It was delivered in 1930 to the Deutsche Reichsbahn (DRG). Schwarzkopff guaranteed in the purchase contract a coal saving of 42% over a standard 01 locomotive design, but in the event the DRG never bought the locomotive.

These were compounded with a single  LP inside cylinder. The wheel arrangement was 4-6-2.

After extensive trials it was found that any increase in efficiency was small compared with the greatly increased maintenance costs. The very complicated H02 1001 was also hopelessly unreliable.

See also
List of DRG locomotives and railcars

References

External links
 

02.10
4-6-2 locomotives
High-pressure steam locomotives
H 02
Railway locomotives introduced in 1930
Experimental locomotives
Individual locomotives of Germany
Berliner locomotives
Standard gauge locomotives of Germany

Passenger locomotives